The Gams Formation is a geologic formation in Austria. It preserves fossils dated to the Cretaceous period.

See also 
 List of fossiliferous stratigraphic units in Austria

References

External links 
 

Geologic formations of Austria
Lower Cretaceous Series of Europe
Cretaceous Austria
Aptian Stage